Ségolène Amiot (born 23 February 1986) is a French politician from La France Insoumise. She was elected as a deputy for Loire-Atlantique's 3rd constituency in the 2022 French legislative election.

See also 

 List of deputies of the 16th National Assembly of France

References 

1986 births
Living people
21st-century French politicians
21st-century French women politicians
Deputies of the 16th National Assembly of the French Fifth Republic
Members of Parliament for Loire-Atlantique
La France Insoumise politicians
Women members of the National Assembly (France)
French LGBT rights activists